Black is a 2005 Indian English- and Hindi-language drama film directed by Sanjay Leela Bhansali. It stars Amitabh Bachchan and Rani Mukerji, with Shernaz Patel and Dhritiman Chatterjee playing supporting roles. The film tells the story of Michelle McNally (Mukerji), a young woman who becomes deaf and blind after recovering from an illness when she was an infant, and follows her meeting with an elderly alcoholic teacher, Debraj Sahai (Bachchan). Bhansali, who wrote the story, co-produced Black under SLB Films with Anshuman Swami of Applause Entertainment and co-wrote the screenplay with Bhavani Iyer and Prakash Kapadia. The soundtrack was composed by Monty Sharma, with lyrics from Prasoon Joshi. It was shot by Ravi K. Chandran on sets built by Omung Kumar, while the editing was done by Bela Sehgal.

The film won 67 awards out of 84 nominations; the direction, performances of the entire cast, art direction, and background score garnered the most attention from various award groups.

Black won three trophies at the 53rd National Film Awards, including Best Feature Film in Hindi and Best Actor (Bachchan). The film received eleven awards, including those for Best Film, Best Director (Bhansali), Best Actor (Bachchan), and Best Actress (Mukerji), at the 51st Filmfare Awards. At the 7th IIFA Awards, it was nominated in ten categories and won nine awards, including Best Film, Best Director for Bhansali, Best Actor for Bachchan, and Best Actress for Mukerji. Among other wins, it also received two Anandalok Puraskar, five Bollywood Movie Awards, eleven Producers Guild Film Awards, ten Screen Awards, six Stardust Awards, and ten Zee Cine Awards.

Awards and nominations

Notes

References

External links 
 Awards and nominations received by Black at IMDb

Black